Felipe Javier Vázquez (né Rivero, born July 5, 1991), nicknamed "Nightmare", is a Venezuelan professional baseball pitcher and convicted sex offender who is currently on the restricted list for the Pittsburgh Pirates. He previously played for the Washington Nationals. He was an All-Star in 2018 and 2019 before his arrest on sexual assault charges led to his being placed on the restricted list by both the Pirates and Major League Baseball.

Professional career

Minor Leagues (2009–2015)
Vázquez signed with the Tampa Bay Rays as an international free agent on July 30, 2008. He represented the Rays at the 2012 All-Star Futures Game. He was added to the Rays' 40-man roster on November 20, 2012.

On February 13, 2014, Vázquez was traded to the Washington Nationals, along with José Lobatón and Drew Vettleson, in exchange for Nate Karns. He suffered through elbow inflammation during the season, and was limited to 14 games started. After the 2014 regular season, the Nationals assigned Vázquez to the Mesa Solar Sox of the Arizona Fall League.

The Nationals transitioned Vázquez into a relief pitcher during spring training in 2015. Vázquez opened the 2015 season with the Syracuse Chiefs of the Class AAA International League.

Washington Nationals (2015–2016)

On April 17, 2015, Vázquez made his major league debut by coming in to pitch the top of the ninth inning in a 7–2 win over the Philadelphia Phillies.  He pitched one inning, allowing two hits and one run while striking out two batters. He went on the disabled list due to gastrointestinal bleeding on April 22. On June 1, the Nationals called up Vázquez to the major leagues from Syracuse. At the end of the season, Vázquez was able to reach  with his fastball in relief. In 49 games for the Nationals, he pitched in  innings, posting a 2–1 record with a 2.79 ERA. With Jonathan Papelbon suspended and Drew Storen injured, Vázquez converted two save opportunities during the final week of the season. He finished the season with a 2.79 earned run average.

During the 2016 season, Vázquez's ERA reached a peak at 6.82 following a game on June 18 where he allowed all six batters he pitched to, to reach base. In the next 13 appearances, he had a 0.93 ERA to lower his season ERA to 4.53.

Pittsburgh Pirates (2016–present)

2016–17
On July 30, 2016, the Nationals traded Vázquez, along with Taylor Hearn, to the Pittsburgh Pirates for Mark Melancon. For the Pirates, he finished with a 3.29 ERA in 28 games.

Vázquez began the 2017 season as a setup reliever. After a 0.58 ERA in 31 games, on June 9 he was named co-closer for the Pirates along with Juan Nicasio, replacing Tony Watson. Vázquez later assumed primary closing duties, with Nicasio becoming the eighth-inning setup man. Vázquez was 5–3 with a 1.67 ERA, and earned 21 saves in 23 opportunities in 2017. His fastest pitch of 2017 was 102.6 miles an hour, second-best in MLB only to pitches by Aroldis Chapman. Of all MLB pitchers, he held left-handed batters to the lowest batting average, .082 (in 20 or more innings).

2018–19: All-Star seasons
Before the 2018 season, Vázquez signed a four-year contract with the Pirates, with club options for another two years. In 2018, Vázquez was selected to play in the 2018 All-Star Game, his first All-Star appearance. For the season, he was 4–2 with 37 saves and a 2.70 ERA.

In an April 7, 2019, game against the Cincinnati Reds, Vázquez was ejected after his role in a bench-clearing incident involving Chris Archer, Derek Dietrich, Yasiel Puig, Amir Garrett, Keone Kela, and David Bell. Vázquez was selected for the 2019 All-Star Game, as a roster replacement for Zack Greinke. On September 10, Vázquez and Kyle Crick got into a clubhouse fight; Crick broke his finger, requiring season-ending surgery. On September 17, the Pirates placed Vázquez on the restricted list, due to his arrest on multiple charges of unlawful contact with a minor. At the time, his record for the season was 5–1 with a 1.65 ERA and 28 saves. He was also placed on administrative leave by Major League Baseball.

Pitching style
As a prospect with the Rays, Vázquez initially threw only . Vázquez began throwing it frequently in 2015, and uses it around 25 percent of the time. The pitch has been referred to as a "Bugs Bunny changeup" by Pirates pitching coach Ray Searage. Vázquez also throws a slider and a curveball.

Personal life
In 2018, he changed his last name from Rivero to Vázquez to match the surname of his sister, citing that she had been a big part of his career.

Child sexual abuse conviction
Vázquez was arrested on September 17, 2019, on charges of computer pornography, specifically alleging that he solicited a child and provided obscene material to minors, regarding an alleged sexual relationship he had with a 13-year-old female from Lee County, Florida. Hours later, Vázquez was charged with statutory sexual assault, unlawful contact with a minor, corruption of minors and indecent assault of a person less than 16 years old related to a separate incident in Westmoreland County, Pennsylvania. Vázquez admitted that in 2017, when the girl was 13 years old, he had a sexual encounter with her that he described as "sex, but not really" because he could not fully insert his penis into her vagina after a minute of trying. He also admitted to sending nude photos of himself and videos of himself engaged in sexual activities to the girl. An additional 21 felony charges (including ten counts of unlawful sexual contact with a minor, ten counts of child pornography, and one count of corruption of a minor) were announced on November 19, 2019, and Vazquez was denied bail. On May 29, 2020, it was reported that Vázquez faced another child pornography charge in St. Louis. Vázquez and his attorneys denied the charges, arguing that the alleged victim showed Vázquez an ID indicating she was at least 18, that he was never informed of his rights by police, and that he never actually confessed. Vázquez's attorneys sought to get the charges dropped in September 2020. Another motion to dismiss the charges was filed in late 2020, this time over jurisdictional issues relating to the state in which the crimes allegedly occurred.

Vázquez's trial commenced on May 17, 2021. On May 20, he was convicted on 15 counts stemming from the relationship with the girl, including: ten counts of sexual abuse of children, two counts of unlawful contact with a minor, one count of statutory sexual assault, one count of corruption of a minor, and one count of indecent assault of someone under 16 years old. He still is facing charges in Missouri and Florida related to the same victim. Vázquez was sentenced to two to four years in state prison on August 17, 2021.

See also
 List of Major League Baseball players from Venezuela

References

External links

1991 births
21st-century criminals
Living people
People convicted of child sexual abuse
People convicted of indecent assault
Sportspeople convicted of crimes
Bowling Green Hot Rods players
Charlotte Stone Crabs players
Gulf Coast Nationals players
Hagerstown Suns players
Harrisburg Senators players
Leones del Caracas players
Major League Baseball pitchers
Major League Baseball players from Venezuela
Mesa Solar Sox players
National League All-Stars
People convicted of statutory rape offenses
Pittsburgh Pirates players
Princeton Rays players
Syracuse Chiefs players
Venezuelan criminals
Venezuelan expatriate baseball players in the United States
Venezuelan Summer League Rays players
Washington Nationals players
People from San Felipe, Venezuela